St. Joseph's Health Center is a not-for-profit hospital network anchored by St. Joseph's Hospital (Syracuse, New York).

History
In March 1860 the Sisters of St. Francis of Philadelphia came to Syracuse in response to a request to teach at Assumption School, and at St. Joseph’s School in Utica. Later that year, they became a separate community, the Sisters of St. Francis of Syracuse. In 1869 they opened St. Joseph Hospital. The school of nursing opened in 1898.

In 1969, on its 100th anniversary, St. Joseph's Hospital changed its name to "St. Joseph's Hospital Health Center" to reflect the greater scope of services provided.

In 2004 the Sisters of St. Francis of Syracuse merged with two other Franciscan congregations to form the Sisters of St. Francis of the Neumann Communities. In 2015, St. Joseph’s Health was acquired by Trinity Health, one of the nation’s biggest health systems. On July 1, the sisters transferred sponsorship of St. Joseph Health to Trinity Health's Catholic Health Ministries.

Present day
St. Joseph’s Health is a non-profit regional health care system based in Syracuse, N.Y.
In February 2019 St. Joseph’s Health Cardiovascular Institute opened an office on Oneida Health’s campus in Oneida. St. Joseph's Home Health Care provides care for adults and children with physical and mental health care needs and assure continuity of care for patients discharged from the hospital. St. Joseph's Health At Home is based in Liverpool, New York; among its services is a Military and Veterans Health Care Program.

In June 2022 it was announced that St. Joseph’s Health would consolidate its administrative functions with Albany's St. Peter's Health Partners to create a single regional operation.

Affiliates
In 2014 Lewis County General Hospital affiliated with St. Joseph's Health.  
 
In 2017 Rome Memorial Hospital became an affiliate of St. Joseph's Health for easier access to specialty care; it retains its own separate identity. (In 2021 Rome Memorial Hospital adopted Rome Health as its new name to more accurately reflect the scope of services provided.)

In 2017 Auburn Community Hospital signed an agreement with St. Joseph's Health and the University of Rochester Medical Center (URMC) which let them share services while each maintaining their own identity and independence. This includes retaining the name "Auburn Community Hospital" (ACH).

References

External links
 St. Joseph's Health website
 "Kaufman Hall Advises St. Josephs Syracuse on Joining Trinity Health System", Kaufman Hall

Hospital networks in the United States